Zholaman Sharshenbekov (born September 29, 1999) is a Kyrgyz Greco-Roman wrestler.  He is a three-time medalist, including gold, at the World Wrestling Championships (2018, 2021, 2022). He is also a three-time medalist, including gold, at the Asian Wrestling Championships (2018, 2020, 2022). In 2020, he won the gold medal in the 60 kg event at the Individual Wrestling World Cup held in Belgrade, Serbia.

In 2022, he won one of the bronze medals in the 60 kg event at the Dan Kolov & Nikola Petrov Tournament held in Veliko Tarnovo, Bulgaria. He won the gold medal in his event at the 2022 Asian Wrestling Championships held in Ulaanbaatar, Mongolia. He won the gold medal in his event at the 2021 Islamic Solidarity Games held in Konya, Turkey. He won the gold medal in the 60 kg event at the 2022 World Wrestling Championships held in Belgrade, Serbia.

Major results

References

External links

 

1999 births
Living people
Kyrgyzstani male sport wrestlers
World Wrestling Championships medalists
Asian Wrestling Championships medalists
Wrestlers at the 2020 Summer Olympics
Olympic wrestlers of Kyrgyzstan
Islamic Solidarity Games medalists in wrestling
Islamic Solidarity Games competitors for Kyrgyzstan
20th-century Kyrgyzstani people
21st-century Kyrgyzstani people
World Wrestling Champions